Charaxes chevroti, the Kagoro demon charaxes, is a butterfly in the family Nymphalidae. It is found in north-central Nigeria. The habitat consists of forests. Known only from the holotype and paratypes. The male is slightly larger than Charaxes etheocles  Cramer, 1777 and the shape of forewing is slightly broader. There is no metallic sheen on the upperside (c.f. Charaxes virilis, Charaxes cedreatis).

Etymology
The species is named for Jean-Claude Chevrot, who collected extensively in the Kagoro Forest (the type location of the species) around 1980.

References

External links
Charaxes chevroti images at Consortium for the Barcode of Life 
African Butterfly Database Range map via search

Butterflies described in 2005
chevroti
Endemic fauna of Nigeria
Butterflies of Africa